Oil City Downtown Commercial Historic District is a national historic district located at Oil City, Venango County, Pennsylvania.  The district includes 51 contributing buildings and 2 contributing structures in the central business district of Oil City.  It primarily includes commercial buildings in a variety of popular architectural styles including Romanesque Revival, Colonial Revival, and Italianate.  Notable buildings include the General Telephone Company Building (1942), Trinity Methodist Episcopal Church (1924), Oil City Boiler Works, Downs Block (1894), Veach Block (1896, 1913), Drake Building (1928), and Oil City National Bank (1926).

It was added to the National Register of Historic Places in 1997.

References

Historic districts on the National Register of Historic Places in Pennsylvania
Italianate architecture in Pennsylvania
Romanesque Revival architecture in Pennsylvania
Colonial Revival architecture in Pennsylvania
Buildings and structures in Oil City, Pennsylvania
National Register of Historic Places in Venango County, Pennsylvania